"Jam Tonight" is a 1987 song written by Freddie Jackson and Paul Laurence Jones, and was originally recorded by Howard Johnson under the title "Jam Song".

Freddie Jackson recording
In 1986, Freddie Jackson recorded the song and included it on his second album, Just Like the First Time. The track was produced by Paul Laurence.

Background
The uptempo single was Jackson's final of four singles from Just Like the First Time and his sixth release to make the number one position on the Hot Black Singles chart, "Jam Tonight" also peaked at number 32 on the Billboard Hot 100, and gave the artist the last of four Top 40 pop crossover singles (only "Rock Me Tonight (For Old Times Sake)", "You Are My Lady", and "He'll Never Love You (Like I Do)" charted higher in the Top 30).

See also
 R&B number-one hits of 1987 (USA)

References

1987 singles
Freddie Jackson songs
Songs written by Paul Laurence
Songs written by Freddie Jackson
Capitol Records singles